Rickenbacker was a Vintage Era automobile manufactured in  Detroit, Michigan, from 1922 until 1927. The car is best known for pioneering production of four-wheel brakes.

History

The company was established by Barney Everitt and Captain Eddie Rickenbacker, with Rickenbacker serving as Vice President and Director of Sales. Everitt's former partners Walter Flanders and William Metzger were also involved.  Rickenbacker used his World War I, 94th Fighter Squadron emblem depicting a top hat inside a ring. The 'Hat in a Ring' emblems were located both on the front and the back of the cars.

The Rickenbacker was designed by engineers Harry L. Cunningham and E.R. Evans. It had a 3,482cc side-valve six-cylinder engine developing 58-hp, which ran very smoothly due to two flywheels, one at each end of the crankshaft.  The first Rickenbackers were displayed at the January 1922 New York Automobile Show. One of the display cars featured experimental four-wheel brakes.

The company made sporting coupés, touring cars, sedans, and roadsters. Four-wheel inside brakes were introduced in 1923. Prices in 1923 ranged from $1,485 for a phaeton to $1,985 for a sedan.  

Several automobile companies began using four-wheel brakes but some companies not offering them began a promotion campaign suggesting they were unsafe, which probably hurt the new Rickenbacker company's sales. The death of Walter Flanders in an automobile accident in 1923 slowed company momentum as well.

In 1924 a coach-brougham enclosed body style was introduced that would grow to represent 60% of Rickenbacker sales.  The six-cylinder engines was up-rated to 60-hp and was joined in 1925 by an 4,401cc eight-cylinder engine developing 80-hp. The model was named Vertical Eight Super Fine which referred to the advanced proprietary engine and the high quality of the cars.

Eddie Rickenbacker resigned from the company in 1926 due to internal discord in the company's leadership. Although 1927 saw new models, designated the 6-70, 8-80, and 8-90, Rickenbacker cars had increased in price and sales were poor.  Before the company closed down due to bankruptcy in 1927, more than 27,000 cars had been built.

The manufacturing equipment was sold to Audi and transported to Germany, somewhat ironic since Rickenbacker renounced his supposed German heritage (he was actually of Swiss ancestry) in light of World War I. This transaction was reflected in Audi Zwickau and Dresden models, using six- or eight-cylinder Rickenbacker engines.

Advertisements

In popular culture
A 1924 model was featured prominently in the Mr. Bevis episode of The Twilight Zone.

See also
 Homer B. Roberts

External links
Rickenbacker Motors Info Website
Rickenbacker automobiles at ConceptCarz
Too Much Too Soon article Hemmings Magazine
Rickenbacker 8 Coupe at Heritage Museum and Gardens
Rickenbacker came up with an innovation that all cars use today but it destroyed the company- NPR Radio

References 

Defunct motor vehicle manufacturers of the United States
Motor vehicle manufacturers based in Michigan
Audi
Defunct manufacturing companies based in Detroit
Vehicle manufacturing companies established in 1921
Vehicle manufacturing companies disestablished in 1927
Vintage vehicles
1920s cars
Cars introduced in 1921